East Wall is an inner city area of the Northside of Dublin, Ireland. Built on reclaimed ground in the 1820s, the area is also 30 minutes walk from Dublin's main thoroughfare, O'Connell Street.

Location
East Wall is bounded by West Road to the west, by Sherrif Street Upper to the south, and was bounded by East Wall Road, Dublin to the north until land reclamation extended that part. It is linked to Ringsend by the East-Link bridge; it is linked to Fairview by Annesley Bridge. The broader region is bounded by Railway lines, the Royal Canal, the River Tolka, the River Liffey and Dublin Port (the Irish Sea), taking in the Dublin Docklands, resulting in a readily identifiable area geographically if somewhat separated from the large city which surrounds it. The southern entrance to the Dublin Port Tunnel is in East Wall.

Development

East Wall dates from the end of the eighteenth century from the time of the construction of the North Wall. It was originally a working-class area, with many finding employment in Dublin Port, adjacent to the area. In the economic boom years from the late 1990s onwards, the area developed rapidly, with the notable addition of the International Financial Services Centre (mostly in neighbouring North Wall), and East Point Business Park on reclaimed land extending East Wall to the north. It has developed rapidly since the late 1990s, and in 2013 regained its status as an officially recognised village  within the framework of Dublin City Development Plan. There has been an increase in the population in recent years to over 5,000. It now contains a number of social organisations across cultural, arts & sporting interests, and it has an award-winning community cultural centre, The Sean O'Casey Centre, which is named after one of its most famous past residents, Seán O'Casey. New businesses have located in the area in recent years. It is located close to the port area, the financial district and with ease of access to Dublin airport.

Amenities

East Wall is primarily a residential neighbourhood of around 1,800 households, with a population of approximately 5,000. The area is serviced by shops, St. Joseph's Church, the Sean O'Casey Community Centre, a primary school and recreational facilities (parks, sea and beach) within walking distance. The community centre includes a sports hall, a theatre and football pitch. St. Barnabas' Church, Dublin would have provided services for Church of Ireland parishioners, such as Seán O'Casey until it closed in 1965 and the parish merged with that of North Strand. There is also a former ESB building which is being used as a transitional shelter for refugees , leading to the East Wall protests.

People
Liam Cunningham, actor.
Jack Nalty, volunteer with the International Brigades, and the last Irishman killed in the Spanish Civil War.
Arthur Murphy, broadcaster.
Roxanna Nic Liam, poet, writer, actor.
Seán O'Casey, the celebrated playwright, grew up in East Wall.
Maureen O'Sullivan, an independent TD.

Notes and references 

Towns and villages in Dublin (city)
Dublin Docklands